Blue Stream is a major trans-Black Sea gas pipeline that carries natural gas to Turkey from Russia. The pipeline has been constructed by the Blue Stream Pipeline B.V., the Netherlands based joint venture of Russian Gazprom and Italian Eni.  The Blue Stream Pipeline B.V. is an owner of the subsea section of pipeline, including Beregovaya compressor station, while Gazprom owns and operates the Russian land section of the pipeline and the Turkish land section is owned and operated by the Turkish energy company BOTAŞ. According to Gazprom the pipeline was built with the intent of diversifying Russian gas delivery routes to Turkey and avoiding third countries.

History
Preparations of the pipeline project started in 1997. In 1997, Gazprom and BOTAŞ signed a 25-year gas sale contract. One of the political goals of the Blue Stream project was to block the path of rival countries aiming to use the territory of Turkey to bring gas from the Caspian area to Europe. 

The construction of the Russian land section took place in 2001–2002 and the offshore section in 2001–2002. The offshore section of the pipeline was built by Italian constructor Saipem and the Russian onshore section by Stroytransgaz, a subsidiary of Gazprom.  The offshore pipe was laid by the pipe-laying vessel Saipem 7000. Gas flows from Russia to Turkey started in February 2003. However, because of the price dispute between Russia and Turkey, the official inauguration ceremony at the Durusu gas metering station took place only on 17 November 2005.  Attending the inauguration were Russian President Vladimir Putin, Turkish Prime Minister Recep Tayyip Erdoğan and Italian Prime Minister Silvio Berlusconi.

Technical features 
Blue Stream full capacity is 16 billion cubic meters (bcm) of natural gas per year. The land section consists of the Stavropolskaya and Krasnodarskaya  compressor stations.

The pipeline uses pipes with different diameters: mainland section , mountainous section  and submarine section .

Operations
Gas from Blue Stream started to flow in February 2003, and the pipeline delivered 1.3 bcm to BOTAŞ in 2003. Gas flows have progressively increased towards the pipeline's capacity of 16 bcm per year. From 2010 to 2014, supplies averaged 14.1 bcm per year, with a high point of 14.7 bcm in 2012.

Contracts 
The contract signed in 1997 was for 365 bcm total.  A BOTAŞ contract for 5.75 bcm a year expires at the end of 2025, thus all 16 bcm expires end 2025.

Blue Stream 2
Blue Stream 2 was first proposed in 2002. In 2005, Vladimir Putin and Recep Tayyip Erdoğan discussed building a second line, and an expansion of the Blue Stream by the Samsun-Ceyhan link and by branch to southeast Europe. This second pipeline, and extension of it up through Bulgaria, Serbia and Croatia to western Hungary was suggested after five countries planned to construct the Nabucco Pipeline from Turkey to Central and Western Europe. However, this expansion was replaced by the South Stream project, which proposed laying subsea pipeline directly from Russia to Bulgaria, which in turn was later replaced by TurkStream. In 2009, Russian prime minister Putin proposed a line parallel to Blue Stream 1 under the Black Sea, and further from Samsun to Ceyhan. From Ceyhan natural gas would have been transported to Syria, Lebanon, Israel, and Cyprus.  The export to Israel would have been through the proposed Ceyhan-Ashkelon subsea pipeline.

See also

South Stream
Nabucco Pipeline
Trans-Caspian Gas Pipeline
South Caucasus Pipeline

References

Further reading
Oksana Gavshina, "The Turkish Gambit", Nezavisimaya Gazeta, 21 November 2005

External links
, Gazprom website

 Blue Stream on Global Energy Monitor

Buildings and structures completed in 2005
Eni
Pipelines under the Black Sea
Natural gas pipelines in Russia
Natural gas pipelines in Turkey
Gazprom pipelines
Russia–Turkey relations
Black Sea energy
2005 establishments in Russia
2005 establishments in Turkey